The Black River, an inland perennial river of the Goulburn Broken catchment, part of the Murray-Darling basin, is located in the lower South Eastern Highlands bioregion and Northern Country/North Central regions of the Australian state of Victoria. The headwaters of the Black River rise on the northern slopes of the Yarra Ranges and descend to flow into the Goulburn River within the Yarra Ranges National Park.

Location and features
The Black River rises in remote state forestry country on the northern slopes of the Yarra Ranges, part of the Great Dividing Range, below Mount Singleton. The river flows generally north, through rugged national park and state forests as the river descends, joined by one minor tributary, before reaching its confluence with the Goulburn River near Burnt Camp. The river descends  over its  course.

See also

References

External links

Goulburn Broken catchment
Rivers of Hume (region)
Tributaries of the Goulburn River